Stefano Olivieri (born 22 June 1983) is a former Italian footballer.

Career
Olivieri started his career at hometown club Giulianova. He played 52 matches at Serie C1 before signed by Chievo in July 2006. He was farmed to Pescara (in co-ownership deal) of Serie B, then Ancona of Serie C1 in 2007–08 season. He won the runner-up and promotion playoffs in Group B with club, and secured another year on loan, with Andrea De Falco, which Olivieri already met him at Pescara.

In 2009–10 season, he failed to loan out, and he was not offered any shirt number.

References

External links
 Profile at Chievo 
 Profile at La Gazzetta dello Sport 2006–07 

Italian footballers
Giulianova Calcio players
A.C. ChievoVerona players
Delfino Pescara 1936 players
A.C. Ancona players
Serie B players
Association football defenders
Sportspeople from the Province of Teramo
1983 births
Living people
Footballers from Abruzzo